The Bentonville Film Festival (BFF) is an American film festival held annually in Bentonville, Arkansas that focuses on diversity.

Foundation
Bentonville Film Festival was founded by actress Geena Davis and ARC Entertainment executive Trevor Drinkwater.  Bentonville was chosen as the location after Walmart, the founding sponsor, suggested it.  After Drinkwater learned Walmart was interested in supporting diversity initiatives, he brought in Davis, who he knew would be interested because of her work with the Geena Davis Institute on Gender in Media.  

The BFF is the only film festival in the world to offer guaranteed multi-platform distribution to its winners. Films that win the Audience, Jury, and Best Family Film awards receive theatrical distribution from AMC Theatres, are shown on Lifetime television, and get a DVD or video-on-demand release from Walmart and Vudu.  In 2015, 87% of the films shown were distributed in some way.

The festival is notable is that until 2018, there was no functioning movie theater in Bentonville. This has led to the practice of turning any gathering area in the city into a potential screening location, included the use of "Cinetransformer" mobile theaters throughout the city.

The festival has experienced attendance growth each year, welcoming 85,000 attendees and showing over 90 feature films, 33 short films and 13 episodes in 2018.

See also 
 Athena Film Festival

References

External links 
 Bentonville Film Festival - Official Website

2015 establishments in Arkansas
Film festivals established in 2015
Film festivals in Arkansas
Bentonville, Arkansas